The 2011 President's Cup was a professional tennis tournament played on hard courts. It was the fifth edition of the tournament which was part of the 2011 ATP Challenger Tour and the third edition for the 2011 ITF Women's Circuit. It took place in Astana, Kazakhstan between 25 and 31 July 2011.

ATP entrants

Seeds

 1 Rankings are as of July 18, 2011.

Other entrants
The following players received wildcards into the singles main draw:
  Andrey Golubev
  Vaja Uzakov
  Serizhan Yessenbekov
  Denis Yevseyev

The following players received entry from the qualifying draw:
  Danjil Braun
  Sergei Krotiouk
  Dmitriy Makeyev
  Lars Übel

WTA entrants

Seeds

 1 Rankings are as of July 18, 2011.

Other entrants
The following players received wildcards into the singles main draw:
  Aselya Arginbayeva
  Ekaterina Klyueva
  Yulia Putintseva
  Anastasiya Yepisheva

The following players received entry from the qualifying draw:
  Yana Buchina
  Yuliya Lysa
  Polina Pekhova
  Maria Zharkova

The following players received entry by a lucky loser spot:
  Prerna Bhambri
  Ekaterina Yashina

Champions

Men's singles

 Mikhail Kukushkin def.  Sergei Bubka, 6–3, 6–4

Women's singles

 Vitalia Diatchenko def.  Akgul Amanmuradova, 6–4, 6–1

Men's doubles

 Konstantin Kravchuk /  Denys Molchanov def.  Arnau Brugués Davi /  Malek Jaziri, 7–6(7–4), 6–7(1–7), [10–3]

Women's doubles

 Vitalia Diatchenko /  Galina Voskoboeva def.  Akgul Amanmuradova /  Alexandra Panova, 6–3, 6–4

References

External links
ITF Search (men)
ITF Search (women) 
ATP official site
WTA official site

President's Cup
President's Cup
President's Cup (tennis)